Trnjaci is a village in the municipality of Ub in western Serbia. According to the 2011 census, the village has a population of 747 inhabitants.

References

External links

Populated places in Kolubara District